{{speciesbox
| genus = Quercus
| image = Quercus salicifolia in Hackfalls Arboretum (2).jpg
| status = LC
| status_system = IUCN3.1
| status_ref = 
| display_parents = 2
| parent = Quercus sect. Lobatae
| species = salicifolia
| authority = Née
| synonyms_ref = 
| synonyms = {{collapsible list|bullets = true
|Cerris salicifolia (Née) Raf.
|Quercus acapulcensis Trel.
|Quercus castanea var. glabrata (Liebm. ex Seem.) A.DC.
|Quercus duratifolia C.H.Mull.
|Quercus mexicana var. glabrata Liebm. ex Seem.
|Quercus tahuasalana Trel.
|}}
}}Quercus salicifolia is a species of oak. It is native to central and southern Mexico and Central America, from Jalisco to Panama.Berendsohn, W.G., A. K. Gruber & J. A. Monterrosa Salomón. 2009. Nova silva cuscatlanica. Árboles nativos e introducidos de El Salvador. Parte 1: Angiospermae - Familias A a L. Englera 29(1): 1–438Correa A., M.D., C. Galdames & M. Stapf. 2004. Catálogo de las Plantas Vasculares de Panamá 1–599. Smithsonian Tropical Research Institute, Panamá

Anales de Ciencias Naturales 3: 265-267 short diagnosis in Latin, description and commentary in Spanish

The epithet "salicifolia" means "willow-leaved" alluding to the resemblance between the leaves of Q. salicifolia and those of several species of Salix.''

References

External links
photo of herbarium specimen at Missouri Botanical Garden, collected in Panamá in 1938

salicifolia
Trees of Central America
Oaks of Mexico
Flora of the Sierra Madre del Sur
Flora of the Central American pine–oak forests
Flora of the Sierra Madre de Oaxaca
Flora of the Sierra Madre Oriental
Plants described in 1801